Ceratophyllus altus is a species of flea in the family Ceratophyllidae. It was described by Tipton and Mendez in 1966.

References 

Ceratophyllidae
Insects described in 1966